In Greek mythology, Phthius (Ancient Greek: φθῖος) was the son of Poseidon and Larisa. The country Phthiotis in southern Thessaly is named after him.

Mythology 
Phthius together with his brothers Achaeus and Pelasgus, they left Achaean Argos with a Pelasgian contingent for Thessaly. They then established a colony on the said country naming it after themselves. The only single source of the accounts of Phthius is recounted by Dionysius of Halicarnassus in his Roman Antiquities about the Pelasgian race's migration.

 "In the sixth generation afterwards, leaving the Peloponnesus, they [Pelasgians] removed to the country which was then called Haemonia and now Thessaly. The leaders of the colony were Achaeus, Phthius and Pelasgus, the sons of Larisa and Poseidon. When they arrived in Haemonia they drove out the barbarian inhabitants and divided the country into three parts, calling them, after the names of their leaders, Phthiotis, Achaia and Pelasgiotis."

Notes

References 
 Dionysus of Halicarnassus, Roman Antiquities. English translation by Earnest Cary in the Loeb Classical Library, 7 volumes. Harvard University Press, 1937–1950. Online version at Bill Thayer's Web Site
 Dionysius of Halicarnassus, Antiquitatum Romanarum quae supersunt, Vol I-IV. . Karl Jacoby. In Aedibus B.G. Teubneri. Leipzig. 1885. Greek text available at the Perseus Digital Library.

Characters in Greek mythology